1,3-Diisopropylbenzene is an aromatic hydrocarbon with the formula C6H4(CHMe2)2 (Me = CH3).  It is one of three isomeric diisopropylbenzenes.  This colorless liquid is prepared by thermal isomerization of 1,4-diisopropylbenzene over a solid acid catalyst.  It is the principal industrial precursor to resorcinol via the Hock rearrangement.

References

Alkylbenzenes
Isopropyl compounds